The women's 100 metres hurdles event at the 2005 Asian Athletics Championships was held in Incheon, South Korea on September 1–2.

Medalists

Results

Heats
Wind: Heat 1: -0.4 m/s, Heat 2: -0.2 m/s

Final
Wind: +0.4 m/s

References
Results

2005 Asian Athletics Championships
Sprint hurdles at the Asian Athletics Championships
2005 in women's athletics